Dieter Gebard is a West German bobsledder who competed in the late 1970s. He won the gold medal in the four-man event at the 1979 FIBT World Championships in Königssee.

References
Bobsleigh four-man world championship medalists since 1930

German male bobsledders
Living people
Year of birth missing (living people)